Med Ad News is a magazine, publishing pharmaceutical business and marketing news. It was started in 1982 and the first issue appeared in September 1982. Its headquarters is in Livingston, New Jersey, United States.

Publishing
Med Ad News is currently published by Outcomes LLC, formerly by Canon Communications and Engel Publishing Partners. Engel Publishing Partners was sold to Canon Communications in 2007. In January 2014, PharmaLive and Med Ad News brands were acquired by Outcomes LLC from UBM.

The content of Med Ad News appears in print six times annually, distributed around the world and on PharmaLive.com.

References

External links
PharmaLive Official Website
EKG vs. ECG: What's The Difference?

1982 establishments in the United States
Business magazines published in the United States
Magazines about advertising
Magazines established in 1982
Magazines published in New Jersey
Medical magazines
Monthly magazines published in the United States